Albert Reginald "Reggie" Knight (1900–1964) was a British diver. He competed at the 1924 Summer Olympics and the 1928 Summer Olympics.

References

External links
 

1900 births
1964 deaths
British male divers
Olympic divers of Great Britain
Divers at the 1924 Summer Olympics
Divers at the 1928 Summer Olympics
Place of birth missing